USS Blackford (APB-45) was a  self-propelled barracks ship that was in service with the United States Navy during the waning days of World War II. She was decommissioned in April 1947 and sold for merchant service. In c. 1968-1970, she was sunk as a target by the South African Military.

Ship history
Authorized as LST-1111, she was redesignated as General Issue Stores Ship Blackford AKS-16 on 8 December 1944. On 2 January 1945, her keel was laid down at Missouri Valley Bridge and Iron Co., and on 6 March 1945 she was once more redesignated, this time as Self-Propelled Barracks Ship Blackford APB-45. She launched on 9 April 1945 and was commissioned 9 July 1945 at Navy Supply Depot, New Orleans.

During the war, Blackford served the U.S. Navy in the Asiatic-Pacific Theatre of Operations.Arriving at Pearl Harbor on 19 August 1945, she joined the 3rd Amphibious Force. On 5 October 1945, she was assigned with Occupation Duty for 25 days up to 30 October 1945.
During the next eight months she served at Eniwetok, Ulithi, Leyte, and Tokyo Bay as a floating barracks. She departed Yokosuka, Japan, 7 April and arrived at New Orleans 14 May 1946. Moving to Orange, Texas, 10 June, she went out of commission in reserve there 26 April 1947.

Post-military service
After 13 years of being laid up in the Atlantic Reserve Fleet, she was struck from the Naval Register on 1 April 1960. 3 years later, in 1963, she was purchased by Collins Submarine Pipeline. She would serve this merchant role until 1968-1970, when she was sunk as a target by the South African military.

Ship awards
World War II Victory Medal
American Campaign Medal
Philippines Liberation Medal
Navy Occupation Service Medal (With Asia Clasp)
Asiatic-Pacific Campaign Medal

References

External links
 NavSource, APB-45
 Shipscribe-USS Blackford APB-45
 Naval Cover Museum, USS Blackford

Benewah-class barracks ships
Blackford County, Indiana
1945 ships